Concepción is one of two volcanoes (along with Maderas) that form the island of Ometepe, which is situated in Lake Nicaragua in Nicaragua, Central America.

Concepción is an active stratovolcano that forms the northwest part of the Isla de Ometepe. It is considered a "pristine" volcano because there has been no influence of other volcanoes on its growth. The growth of the volcano comes in phases based on weaknesses of the crust that the volcano rests on. As it grows from additional magma flow, the volcano grows in mass and exerts pressure on the crust. This causes shifts which in turn cause more volcanic growth. This affects the magma chamber which begins the cycle again with growth because of magmatic flow.

Since 1883, Concepción has erupted at least 25 times; its last eruption was on 9 March 2010. Concepción's eruptions are characterized by frequent, moderate-sized explosions. Active fumaroles are present just north of Concepción's summit crater.

Adventure seekers from all over the world travel to Ometepe Island to climb Volcán Concepción. There are numerous trails in the tropical forest that surrounds the volcano's ash-covered peak.

See also 
 List of volcanoes in Nicaragua

References

External links 

 Volcano World: Concepción, Nicaragua

Mountains of Nicaragua
Stratovolcanoes of Nicaragua
Active volcanoes
Rivas Department
Holocene stratovolcanoes
First 100 IUGS Geological Heritage Sites